Still Striving is the second mixtape by American rapper ASAP Ferg. It was released through ASAP Worldwide, Polo Grounds Music, and RCA Records on August 18, 2017. The album features guest appearances from Meek Mill, Cam'ron, Dave East, Lil Yachty, Nav, Famous Dex, Playboi Carti, Migos, ASAP Rocky, MadeinTYO, Busta Rhymes, French Montana, Rick Ross, and Snoop Dogg. It was supported by the single "Plain Jane".

Background
On November 11, 2016, ASAP Ferg revealed the title of his next project. On July 28, 2017, ASAP Ferg revealed the official release date for Still Striving. The project's artwork was revealed on August 2, 2017. The mixtape’s lead and only single, "Plain Jane", was released on June 13, 2017.

Track listing
Credits adapted from Tidal.

Track notes
 signifies a co-producer
 "Tango" contains additional vocals by King Kanobby

Sample credits
 "Mad Man" contains a sample of "Tear da Club Up", performed by Three 6 Mafia.
 "Plain Jane" contains portions of "Slob On My Knob", performed by Three 6 Mafia.
 "Nasty (Who Dat)" contains interpolations of "Who Dat", performed by JT Money featuring Solé.

Personnel
Credits adapted from Tidal.

Performers
 ASAP Ferg – primary artist
 Meek Mill – featured artist 
 Cam'ron – featured artist 
 Dave East – featured artist 
 Lil Yachty – featured artist 
 Nav – featured artist 
 Famous Dex – featured artist 
 Playboi Carti – featured artist 
 Migos – featured artist 
 ASAP Rocky – featured artist 
 Rich the Kid – featured artist 
 MadeinTYO – featured artist 
 Busta Rhymes – featured artist 
 French Montana – featured artist 
 Rick Ross – featured artist 
 Snoop Dogg – featured artist 
 King Kanobby - additional vocals 

Technical
 Jeffrey "RAMZY" Ramirez – recording engineer 
 King Kanobby – mixing engineer 
 Miz The Wiz – assistant mixing engineer 
 Ray Seay – mixing engineer 
 Ethan Stevens – recording engineer 
 Juan "Saucy" Peña – recording engineer 
 Hector Delgado – mixing engineer 
 Federico "C Sik" Lopez – assistant mixing engineer 

Instruments
 Sam Barsh – keyboard 
 Daniel Seeff – guitar 

Production
 Frankie P – producer 
 30 Roc – producer 
 Maaly Raw – producer 
 Rex Kudo – producer 
 Charlie Handsome – producer 
 Honorable C.N.O.T.E. – producer 
 Kirk Knight – producer 
 Skitzo – producer 
 Digital Nas – producer 
 DJ Khalil – producer 
 Nick Barbs – A$R 
 Tariq Beats – co-producer

Charts

Weekly charts

Year-end charts

Certifications

References

2017 albums
Albums produced by Honorable C.N.O.T.E.
Albums produced by Kirk Knight
Albums produced by DJ Khalil
RCA Records albums
ASAP Ferg albums